Thimmajipeta is a Mandal in Nagarkurnool district, Telangana.

Institutions
 Zilla Parishad High School for Boys
 Zilla Parishad High School for Girls
 Government Junior Inter College

Villages
The villages in Thimmajipeta mandal include:
 Ammapally 	
 Appajipalli 	
 Avancha 	
 Bajipoor 	
 Bavajipally 	
 Buddasamudram 	
 Chegunta 	
 Gorita
 Gummakonda 	
 Ippalapally 	
 Kodparthy 	
 Marepalle 	
 Marikal 	
 Nerellapally 	
 Pothireddipally 	
 Pullagiri
 Rallacheruvu Thanda 	
 Thimmajipet 	
 Yadireddipally

References

Mandals in Nagarkurnool district